MS  is a cruise ship owned and operated by Nippon Yusen Kaisha. She was originally built by the Mitsubishi Heavy Industries shipyard in Nagasaki, Japan, as Crystal Harmony for Crystal Cruises. In 2006, Crystal Harmony was transferred from the fleet of Crystal Cruises to that of Crystal's parent company, Nippon Yusen Kaisha, and entered service under her current name. , she was the largest cruise ship in Japan.

Service history

1990–2006: Crystal Harmony

Crystal Harmony drifted without power for sixteen hours but after repairs made it to port under her own steam and disembarked her passengers in Panama. She sailed to the island of Curaçao, escorted by a tugboat, for repairs.

2006 onwards: Asuka II

After fifteen years of service, Crystal Harmony was retired from the Crystal fleet in 2005. She was transferred to the parent company Nippon Yusen Kaisha to replace the Asuka. She then underwent renovation and re-entered service as Asuka II.

She caught fire again on June 16, 2020, while at dock in Yokohama.

2021 COVID-19 case 
On 30 April 2021, the ship was en route from the Port of Yokohama and was scheduled to stop at Aomori and Hokkaido prefectures when one case of COVID-19 was detected on board. The passenger was reportedly stable and in isolation in a cabin. The ship returned to Yokohama were the rest of passengers and crew were disembarked.

References

External links
 Marine traffic
 asukacruise.co.jp

1989 ships
Cruise ships
Ships built by Mitsubishi Heavy Industries
COVID-19 pandemic in Japan
Cruise ships involved in the COVID-19 pandemic